Theodore Hsu  (/ˈʃuː/; Chinese: 徐正陶; born March 4, 1964) is a Canadian physicist and politician who has represented Kingston and the Islands in the Legislative Assembly of Ontario since 2022 as a member of the Ontario Liberal Party. Before entering provincial politics, Hsu served as a Member of Parliament (MP) representing Kingston and the Islands federally from the 2011 to 2015 as a member of the Liberal Party of Canada.

Early life and career 
Hsu was born in Bartlesville, Oklahoma, in 1964 to James and Marjorie and is the oldest of three siblings. Of Chinese descent, Hsu is fluent in English, French, and Mandarin. When he was six months old, the family moved to Kingston, Ontario, where his father joined Queen's University as a chemical engineering professor.

Hsu attended high school at Kingston's Loyalist Collegiate and Vocational Institute. In 1984, he graduated from Queen's University with a Bachelor of Science Honours in physics. He pursued graduate studies at Princeton University, where he completed his PhD in physics in 1989 after successfully defending his dissertation titled "Towards an understanding of the large U-Hubbard model and a theory for high temperature superconductors," under the supervision of Philip W. Anderson, recipient of the 1977 Nobel Prize in Physics. Hsu went on to complete post-doctoral research in Chalk River, Vancouver, and France.

Applying his technical and research skills in math, computing, and problem-solving to capital markets, Hsu worked as a researcher and trader in Paris and Philadelphia for Banque Nationale de Paris, and as an executive director in the Tokyo office of Morgan Stanley, a global investment bank.

Hsu is a long-term member of SWITCH, a Kingston-based not-for-profit association that promotes local job creation and green economic growth. From 2007 to 2011, he served as the executive director of SWITCH and compiled the first Greenhouse Gas Inventory for Kingston. Currently, he is SWITCH's secretary.

Politics
Hsu acted as treasurer of the Kingston and the Islands Federal Liberal Association from 2007 to 2010, and was an active member of its policy committee. During this time, he supported the 2007 provincial and 2008 federal Liberal campaigns for John Gerretsen and Peter Milliken, the longest-serving Speaker in the House of Commons.  Following Milliken's announcement in summer 2010 that he would not seek re-election, Hsu won the Liberal nomination in November to be the party's 2011 candidate.

In Parliament 
In the federal election held on May 2, 2011, Hsu defeated Conservative candidate Alicia Gordon by less than 3,000 votes. He was one of only two new Liberal MPs elected in Canada in what was the party's poorest showing in history.

One of only a few MPs with an academic science background, Hsu served in the Liberal Party shadow cabinet as the critic for science and technology. He also would serve as critic for the Federal Economic Development Agency for Southern Ontario and critic for the Federal Economic Development Initiative for Northern Ontario. In August, 2013, Liberal leader Justin Trudeau appointed Hsu to an additional role as Liberal critic for post-secondary education.

In 2011, Hsu was the first runner-up to Conservative MP Chris Alexander as Rookie of the Year, in Maclean's annual Parliamentarians of the Year awards. Hsu was also the first runner-up for the Rising Star award for Maclean's in 2012 and the annual accolades continued in November 2013, with Hsu winning the Maclean's Parliamentarian of the Year Award. He was voted by parliamentarians from all parties as the MP who "Best Represents Constituents."

In August 2014, Hsu announced that he would not run for re-election in the upcoming 2015 federal election, citing the burdens of political life on his young family.

Before leaving federal politics, he introduced a noteworthy private member's bill in September 2014. "Bill C-626, An Act to Amend the Statistics Act" was designed to appoint a chief statistician and to reinstate the long-form census, which had been eliminated by the Conservative Party in 2010. Ultimately, the long-form census was restored in 2015, immediately after the new Liberal government took office, but after Hsu had left. (See Canada 2011 Census.)

Post-Parliament 
Upon leaving the House of Commons, Hsu served as the campaign manager for Liberal MPP Sophie Kiwala during the 2018 provincial election in Ontario and, in 2019, during the Canadian federal election Hsu also managed the successful re-election campaign of Mark Gerretsen, the Liberal MP who replaced him.

In 2017, Hsu joined SYNG pharmaceuticals, a Kingston-based biotechnology startup focusing on diagnosing and treating endometriosis. As an advisor for SYNG, Hsu provided communications support.

From 2019-2020, Hsu was asked to co-chair the Mayor's Task Force on Housing, which culminated in a report and a series of recommendations to address Kingston's challenging housing shortage.

Return to politics
In 2020, Hsu announced his campaign to represent Kingston and the Islands as the Ontario Liberal Party candidate in the upcoming provincial election. He won the bid over previous MPP Sophie Kiwala, who lost in the 2018 Ontario election, in November 2020.

When asked about his motivations for re-entering politics, Hsu said, "As my kids and their young friends have grown up and become aware of their world, they tell me how worried they are." He went on to say, "I want to offer voters someone who has a proven record representing constituents, and also has experience working with scientists, climate researchers, economists, engineers and entrepreneurs." He was elected in the 2022 Ontario general election. He currently holds the Ontario Liberal Party critic roles for the Ministry of Energy, Ministry of Natural Resources and Forestry, Ministry of Mines, and the Ministry of Citizenship and Multiculturalism.

Electoral record

Source: 2Z3 Elections Canada

References

External links
 Ted Hsu
 

1964 births
Canadian physicists
Liberal Party of Canada MPs
Living people
Members of the House of Commons of Canada from Ontario
People from Bartlesville, Oklahoma
People from Kingston, Ontario
Princeton University alumni
Queen's University at Kingston alumni
Morgan Stanley employees
Canadian politicians of Chinese descent
21st-century Canadian politicians
Ontario Liberal Party MPPs